Danda Mohamed Kondeh (born in Koinadugu District, Sierra Leone)  is a Sierra Leonean economist and politician. He is currently a member of parliament of Sierra Leone from his home district of Koinadugu. He is a member of the ruling All People's Congress (APC).

Kondeh was the Central Neya Chiefdom Administrative in Koinadugu District. He has also serve as Finance Clerk and District Councilor of Koinadugu District before he won a seat in the Sierra Leone Parliament in the 2007 Sierra Leone presidential and Parliamentary elections. Kondeh is a muslim and member of the Mandingo ethnic group originated from Guinea.

External links
https://web.archive.org/web/20090707014728/http://www.sl-parliament.org/composition.htm
https://web.archive.org/web/20110727020730/http://www.news.sl/drwebsite/publish/printer_20055665.shtml

Living people
Sierra Leonean politicians
Sierra Leonean economists
People from Koinadugu District
Sierra Leonean Mandingo people
Sierra Leonean people of Guinean descent
Year of birth missing (living people)